Himuro Shrine (氷室神社, Himuro Jinja) is a Shinto shrine in Nara, Nara Prefecture, Japan. It was established in 710. Kami enshrined here include Emperor Nintoku and Nukata no Onakatsuhiko no Mikoto (額田大仲彦命). The shrine's main festival is held annually on October 1.

Gallery

References
Joseph Cali with John Dougill, Shinto Shrines: A Guide to the Sacred Sites of Japan's Ancient Religion (University of Hawai'i Press, 2013).

External links
Official website

Shinto shrines in Nara Prefecture
8th-century establishments in Japan
Religious buildings and structures completed in 710